Fontbonne University is a private Roman Catholic university in Clayton, Missouri. It enrolled 955 students in 2021. Fontbonne is accredited by the Higher Learning Commission and it offers undergraduate, master's, and doctoral degree programs. Its athletic teams compete in the St. Louis Intercollegiate Athletic Conference.

History

Early history
Fontbonne University, founded in 1923 as Fontbonne College as a women's college, takes its name from Mother St. John Fontbonne, who, in 1808 after the French Revolution, refounded the Congregation of the Sisters of St. Joseph (CSJ). More than a century and a half before, in 1650, the Sisters of St. Joseph had been founded in LePuy, France. During the French Revolution, the sisters were forced to return to their homes and the community was dispersed. Some 28 years after the re-founding, six Sisters of St. Joseph came to the United States in 1836 and established American roots at Carondelet, a small community in south St. Louis, Missouri within the Archdiocese of St. Louis. Five years later, in 1841, they opened St. Joseph's Academy for girls.

First classes began at Carondelet College following World War I, with the first eight baccalaureate degrees given in 1927. By then, a new campus at the current location was built to accommodate the increase in students. Over the next 20 years a liberal arts curriculum was developed. A cafeteria, swimming pool, and gymnasium were added to the original buildings (Ryan Hall, Science Building, Fine Arts Building). Medaille Hall, the university's first residence hall, was dedicated. The school, initially affiliated with the University of Missouri and Catholic University of America, received North Central accreditation and degree-granting powers. 

In the 1950s its Department of Education was expanded to include special education, behavioral disorders, learning disabilities, and mental handicaps. A major in deaf education linked Fontbonne with St. Joseph's Institute for the Deaf. The department of communication disorders was established to prepare teachers for speech-impaired children and adults. Insufficient space led to the high school and college sections to be separated and the former moved to its new campus in the suburb of Frontenac in 1955. The college section became "Fontbonne College" as the academy name now solely referred to the high school.

Recent history
Fontbonne College became co-educational in the 1970s. Service programs were expanded to areas such as dietetics, special education, communication disorders and deaf education. A predominantly lay board of trustees was formed. The Fontbonne Library was dedicated, along with two more residence halls.

The first male president, Dr. Dennis C. Golden, was inaugurated in September 1995. The school celebrated its 75th anniversary during the 1998–99 academic year. March 14, 2002 marked the change in status from Fontbonne College to Fontbonne University. On February 1, 2014, J. Michael (Mike) Pressimone, Ed.D., was selected the 14th president of Fontbonne University. He assumed office on July 1, 2014.

In 2017, Fontbonne purchased 23 acres of the former JFK High School in western St. Louis County to allow its student-athletes to train and play home games. The new space will also allow the college to offer adult and continuing education courses.  In 2020, it put up the former JFK high school for sale to concentrate on its main campus instead. 

Nancy Blattner became the university's 15th president in 2020. She was previously the president of Caldwell University and had been Fontbonne's Vice President of Academic Affairs from 2004 to 2009.

In 2022, it was revealed that the huge drop in enrollment of students from 2,293 (in 2011) to 955 (in 2021) has caused the university to operate at a deficit for the past 10 years.

Athletics
The Fontbonne athletic teams are called the Griffins. The university is a member of the Division III level of the National Collegiate Athletic Association (NCAA), primarily competing in the St. Louis Intercollegiate Athletic Conference (SLIAC) since it was a founding member back in the 1989–90 academic year. The Griffins also previously competed in the Show–Me Conference (now currently known as the American Midwest Conference since the 1994–95 school year) of the National Association of Intercollegiate Athletics (NAIA) from 1986–87 to 1989–90 (the latter school year was due to dual membership within the NAIA and the NCAA Division III ranks).

Fontbonne competes in 23 intercollegiate varsity sports: Men's sports included baseball, basketball, cross country, golf, soccer, sprint football (beginning in 2022), track & field (indoor and outdoor), volleyball and wrestling; while women's sports include basketball, cross country, golf, soccer, softball, stunt (formerly co-ed), track & field (indoor and outdoor), volleyball and wrestling; and co-ed sports include cheerleading, dance and eSports (which none of the co-ed sports are recognized or governed by the NCAA). Former sports included men's & women's tennis.

Sprint football
Sprint football, a weight-restricted form of American football governed outside the NCAA structure, will be added in 2022. Fontbonne is one of six charter members of the Midwest Sprint Football League.

Notable alumni
 Bob Cassilly - sculptor and founder of the City Museum
 Sam Dotson - security expert
 Karla Drenner - American academic and politician from Georgia
 Suzy Gorman - American photographer
 John Hayden Jr. was appointed as the 35th Police Commissioner of Metropolitan Police Department, City of St. Louis
 Ken Page - American cabaret singer and actor
 Mary Louise Preis - former Maryland State Delegate, 1991-1999
 Nate Tate - Republican member of the Missouri House of Representatives, representing District 119 since 2016.

References

External links

 Official website
 Official athletics website

 
Liberal arts colleges in Missouri
Universities and colleges in St. Louis County, Missouri
Sisters of Saint Joseph colleges and universities
Association of Catholic Colleges and Universities
Educational institutions established in 1923
Private universities and colleges in Missouri
Catholic universities and colleges in Missouri
Former women's universities and colleges in the United States
Roman Catholic Archdiocese of St. Louis
1923 establishments in Missouri